FC Nosta Novotroitsk is a Russian association football club based in Novotroitsk, Orenburg Oblast. The club finished 16th in the Russian First Division in 2009 and was relegated to the Russian Second Division. In early 2010 it was announced that the club is dissolved due to lack of financing. However, in February 2010, the new sponsorship was arranged and the club continued playing.

League results

Current squad
As of 22 February 2023, according to the official Second League website.

Notable players
Had international caps for their respective countries. Players whose name is listed in bold represented their countries while playing for Nosta.

USSR/Russia
  Aleksei Bakharev
 Denis Boyarintsev

Former USSR countries
 Emin Agaev

 Rahmatullo Fuzailov
 Vladislav Lungu
 Dmitry Molosh
 Mantas Savėnas

 Mikhail Rozhkov
 Oleg Sinelobov
 Anatoli Volovodenko

References

External links
Official website 

Football clubs in Russia
Association football clubs established in 1991
Sport in Orenburg Oblast
1991 establishments in Russia